Toning exercises are physical exercises that are used with the aim of developing a physique with a large emphasis on musculature. In this context, the term toned implies leanness in the body (low levels of body fat), noticeable muscle definition and shape, but not significant muscle size ("bulk").

Research and basic anatomical knowledge imply that the notion of specific exercises to improve tone is unfounded. Exercises can aid fat loss or stimulate muscle hypertrophy, but cannot otherwise improve tone. The size of the muscle can change, as can the amount of fat covering the muscle, but the 'shape' cannot.

The words "tone" and "toning" can be misleading as they suggest that spot reduction is possible, which it is not. More accurate descriptions are "muscle building" and "fat loss."

Exercises 
Exercises popularly believed to improve tone are primarily weight lifting exercises performed with high repetitions and low resistance (low weight), with short rest periods.

This conventional wisdom is however criticized as poor-quality and inefficient. What is advocated is an exercise routine involving:

 resistance training - to stimulate muscle breakdown and repair (increasing muscle mass will raise metabolism, as muscle has a higher calorific usage than fat);
 cardiovascular exercise (particularly interval training) to burn calories;
 optimal diet (nutrition) to manipulate calorie intake and provide sufficient nutrients for muscle growth. The primary requirement for looking toned is obtaining low body fat, as it is fat that creates a 'soft' look.

See also
 Spot reduction, the fallacy that fat can be targeted for reduction from a specific area of the body

Notes

Strength training
Physical exercise